New Mexico is a state located in the Western United States. According to the 2020 United States Census, New Mexico is the 15th least-populous state with  inhabitants but the 5th-largest by land area, spanning . New Mexico is divided into 33 counties and contains 106 municipalities consisting of cities, towns, villages and an incorporated county.

All municipalities are granted local government powers including the collection of property tax, funding of fire protection and public transit, providing and maintaining public parks, cemeteries, hospitals, libraries, and museums, building and zoning regulations, and the maintenance of municipal water, sewer, electric, natural gas and solid waste utilities. Municipalities in New Mexico may adopt one of five forms of municipal government including Mayor-Council, Mayor-Council with Manager, Council-Manager, Commission-Manager, or City-County Council-Manager. All municipalities over 10,000 people must elect their representatives by district, with those under 10,000 having option to do so. Citizens in a Mayor-Council form of government elect a mayor (who only votes to break a tie, and does not have veto power), and a council of 4 to 10 councilors or trustees. Any municipality with a population over 1,000 with a Mayor/Council form of government may establish the office of manager who is not elected and administers the hiring and firing of municipal employees, enforces ordinances, prepares the budget, but cannot vote on council. The manager in a Commission/Manager municipality has identical powers to the manager in the Mayor/Council form of government. Mayor-Council system can be changed to a Commission/Manager municipality by popular vote if the population exceeds 3,000. Citizens in a Commission/Manager municipality may also vote on initiatives, referendums and recalls and the mayor has the right to vote on council issues. Only one municipality, Los Alamos, is an incorporated City-County with a Council-Manager system through the Los Alamos County Charter. Municipalities may also adopt a home rule charter which gives local municipalities powers not specifically authorized for municipalities by the state statutes.  Twelve municipalities have adopted home rule or a charter in New Mexico.

The smallest municipality by population is Grenville with 22 residents.

List of municipalities

See also
 List of census-designated places in New Mexico

Notes

References

New Mexico, List of municipalities in
Municipalities
Populated places in New Mexico